Lake Beloye or White Lake (or Valgjärv, in both languages the meaning is White lake), is a lake in the northwestern part of Vologda Oblast in Russia. Administratively, the lake is divided between Belozersky District (south) and Vashkinsky District (north) of Vologda Oblast. The town of Belozersk, is located on its coast. In terms of area, Lake Beloye is the second natural lake of Vologda Oblast (behind Lake Onega), and the third lake also behind the Rybinsk Reservoir. It is one of the ten biggest natural lakes in Europe.

Geography
The basin of the lake includes parts of Belozersky, Vashkinsky, Babayevsky, and Vytegorsky Districts of Vologda Oblast, as well as minor areas in Kargopolsky District of Arkhangelsk Oblast. Most of the basin lies north of the lake, in the Andoma Hills, and includes smaller lakes, many of them being of glacial origin. These lakes include Lake Kovzhskoye, Lake Kemskoye, Lake Kushtozero, Lake Sholskoye, Lake Druzhinnoye, and, south of Lake Beloye, Lake Lozskoye.

The lake drains into the Sheksna River, which is a tributary of the Rybinsk Reservoir of the Volga River. The Sheksna flows out of the eastern corner of the lake. The main tributaries of Lake Beloye are the Kovzha, the Kema, and the Megra.

The lake and the Belozersky Canal around it are a part of the Volga–Baltic Waterway. The Belozersky Canal was constructed to connect the Sheksna and the Kovzha Rivers in order to bypass Lake Beloye, where sometimes strong wind occur. The canal follows the southern and the western coasts of the lake.

History
According to the Primary Chronicle, Sineus, a brother of Rurik, became the prince of Beloozero in 862. If this would be correct, Belozersk would be one of the oldest towns in Russia. However, most likely Sineus never existed, and the earliest archaeological data in or around Belozersk belong to the 10th century. In the 10th-13th centuries the area was controlled by the Novgorod Republic, then in the 13th century it was part of the Principality of Beloozero, and in the 14th century it entered the Grand Duchy of Moscow. The Mariinsk Canal system was constructed in the early 19th century, and after the reconstruction in the 20th century it became the Volga–Baltic Waterway.

References

External links

Beloye
LBeloye